Isaac Cole (9 April 1886 – ) was an English rugby union and professional rugby league footballer who played in the 1900s and 1910s.

Isaac Cole scored 6 tries playing on the wing for Huddersfield on 30 January 1907 in the 63–0 victory over Liverpool City.

He played for Huddersfield in the 8–19 defeat by New Zealand on Saturday 12 October 1907.

Upon signing for Wakefield Trinity on Tuesday 1 February 1910, the game against Rochdale Hornets was cancelled due to the weather, resulting in them being unable to qualify him for the cup ties, although he did receive a Yorkshire League winners medal in that year.

In the benefit match played for Ernest Whitehouse, on 21 December 1919, Isaac Cole played for the defeated Billy Batten XIII versus Halifax by 6–16. Ernest Whitehouse was a World War I leg amputee who had played for Whitwood Melbourne (RU), Castleford (1912), been registered with Hull F.C. (28 January 1913 – 1916) and played for York and Halifax in 1917–18. The benefit match was the first rugby league game to be played at Wheldon Road, Castleford.

Background
Cole was born in Pontefract, West Riding of Yorkshire, England, and he died aged 53 in Halifax, West Riding of Yorkshire, England.

Playing career

International honours
Isaac Cole won a cap for England (RL) while at Castleford in 1906 in the 3–3 draw with Other Nationalities on Monday 1 January 1906 at Central Park, Wigan.

This game was the last 15-a-side rugby league international to be played, and 'Cole at 19 years and eight months old, was thought to have been the youngest forward of either code to have played at international level up to that time'.

County honours
In Yorkshire trial games, Isaac Cole played for "The Stripes" in the 8–13 defeat by "The Whites" at Huddersfield on Monday 25 September 1905, and "The Possibles" in the 18–15 victory over "The Probables" at Hull on Tuesday 10 October 1905.

Isaac Cole won one cap for Yorkshire in the 0–8 defeat by Lancashire at Hull on Saturday 4 November 1905, while at Castleford.

He was also selected as reserve for Yorkshire against Cumberland for the game at Whitehaven on Saturday 13 January 1906.

County League appearances
Isaac Cole played in Wakefield Trinity's victory in the Yorkshire County League during the 1910–11 season.

County Cup Final appearances
Isaac Cole didn't play in Huddersfield's 21–0 victory over Batley in the 1909 Yorkshire County Cup Final during the 1909–10 season at Headingley Rugby Stadium, Leeds on Saturday 27 November 1909, in front of a crowd of 22,000, and he didn't play in Wakefield Trinity's 8–2 victory over Huddersfield in the 1910 Yorkshire County Cup Final during the 1910–11 season at Headingley Rugby Stadium, Leeds on Saturday 3 December 1910, in front of a crowd of 10,000.

References

1886 births
1940 deaths
Castleford RFC players
England national rugby league team players
English rugby league players
English rugby union players
Halifax R.L.F.C. players
Huddersfield Giants players
Keighley Cougars players
Rugby league players from Pontefract
Rugby league utility players
Rugby league wingers
Rugby union players from Pontefract
Wakefield Trinity players
York Wasps players
Yorkshire rugby league team players